Graham W. Caulfield (born 1943) is an English former footballer who played as a centre forward.

Career
Born in Leeds, Caulfield played for Frickley Colliery, York City, Bradford City and Ossett Albion.

He played for Bradford City between July 1967 and 1968, making one appearance in the Football League.

Sources

References

1943 births
Living people
English footballers
Frickley Athletic F.C. players
York City F.C. players
Bradford City A.F.C. players
Ossett Albion A.F.C. players
English Football League players
Association football forwards